CBK is a Canadian public radio station, licensed to Watrous, Saskatchewan. It broadcasts the CBC Radio One network on an assigned frequency of 540 kHz to most of southern and central Saskatchewan. Its studios are located at the CBC's broadcast centre at 2440 Broad Street in Regina, with an additional bureau in the Saskatoon Co-op building on 4th Avenue South in Saskatoon. The Regina facility also houses CBK-FM and CBKT-DT.

Transmitter and signal
When the CBC established CBK, it located the transmitter in Watrous, about 150 kilometres (90 miles) northwest of Regina and about 100 kilometres (60 miles) southeast of Saskatoon. The site, off Agnes Street, was chosen to provide the best possible AM broadcast signal to the densely populated portion of Saskatchewan, including both cities. CBK operates as a  Class A clear-channel station, operating at 50,000 watts around the clock from a non-directional transmitter in Watrous.

Due to its location near the bottom of the AM dial, high transmitter power and Saskatchewan's mostly flat land (with near-perfect soil conductivity), CBK's daytime signal reaches most of the southern two-thirds of the province, including Regina, Saskatoon, Yorkton, Swift Current, Lloydminster, Moose Jaw and Prince Albert. It also provides grade B coverage as far west as Calgary and as far east as Winnipeg, and reaches across the border into North Dakota and Montana.

History
CBK was launched by the CBC in 1939, serving most of Saskatchewan from the single transmitter site. It was originally intended as the CBC's clear-channel station for the Prairies. (CKY in Winnipeg, now CBW, was also a clear-channel, but was a privately-owned CBC Network affiliate at the time.)  At first, CBK aired no local shows. All programming was initially fed from Toronto, then after 1948 from Winnipeg. A local studio didn't open until 1954, on Broad Street in Regina.

For most of World War II, CBK aired programming in both English and French.

CBK was almost forced to move its dial location in 1947, when the International Telecommunications Conference considered designating 540 for low-powered stations. Eventually, the ITC agreed to allow CBK to stay on 540 until an alternate location could be found.

In 1975 the original tube powered transmitter built by RCA was replaced by a solid state transmitter. The following year on June 4, 1976 CBK's transmitting tower was toppled by strong winds during a thunderstorm. CBK's staff went back on the air in the cities of Regina and Saskatoon by temporarily taking over CBC's low powered FM transmitters normally used to air French language programming.  Within a few days, the  540 kHz signal was restored using a temporary tower while a new permanent one was built.

One of the station's distinctive features was its Art Deco style transmitter building in Watrous. It featured a studio to keep the station on the air in the event of an emergency, living quarters for station staff, a map of Canada showing CBC stations and private affiliates, and an underground fallout shelter with a studio to broadcast news in the event of a nuclear attack. In 2007 the transmitting equipment was moved from the original transmitter building to a steel shed next to the tower. There was an effort by the town of Watrous to designate the transmitter a historic site. In recent years the original transmitter building has been vacant and has fallen into disrepair. Due to the cost to high cost of removing dangerous materials such as asbestos and lead paint, CBC Saskatchewan decided to demolish the transmitter building in August 2015, rather than restore it.

Local programming
CBK and its repeater stations air several local shows, in addition to CBC network programming.  Weekdays begin with The Morning Edition.  At noon, Blue Sky is heard and in afternoon drive time, Afternoon Edition is broadcast. Saturday and Sunday mornings, Saskatchewan Weekend airs.

In Saskatoon, CBK-1-FM 94.1 has carried its own local morning program, Saskatoon Morning, in place of the Regina-based wake up show The Morning Edition, since 2013.  It airs from the CBC's Saskatoon bureau in the Affinity Building at 100-128 4th Avenue South in downtown Saskatoon. Saskatoon Morning began streaming online on April 29, and began airing on 94.1 in September after the CBC won Canadian Radio-television and Telecommunications Commission approval to move the program over-the-air.  For the rest of its broadcasting day, CBK-FM-1 carries the same programming as CBK.

Rebroadcasters
In 2000, the CBC opened a local FM repeater of CBK in Regina, CBKR-FM 102.5. In 2006, a Saskatoon repeater was added, CBK-1-FM 94.1. Both cities had been plagued with reception problems of the main 540 AM signal.

CBK has the following rebroadcasters. Except for its Regina, Saskatoon and Meadow Lake transmitters, all are officially part of the licence of CBKA-FM in La Ronge (see below):

Community-owned rebroadcasters

Though separately licensed, CBKA-FM in La Ronge is a full-time satellite of CBK. Until 2009, that station produced its own noon-hour show and regional news updates, although it aired both The Morning Edition and The Afternoon Edition.

References

External links
Radio locator info on CBK
CBC Saskatchewan
 

BK
BK
BK
Radio stations established in 1939
1939 establishments in Saskatchewan
Clear-channel radio stations